The WIG20 is a capitalization-weighted stock market index of the twenty largest companies on the Warsaw Stock Exchange. WIG is an acronym for "Warszawski Indeks Giełdowy", which translates to Warsaw Stock Index in Polish. However, so that no sector would dominate the index, the rule was introduced that there can be a maximum of 5 companies per sector. In this way, for example, we have 5 banks in the index. Companies also have different shares in the index, with clear consequences.

The all-time high of the index is 3,940.53 points, set during the intraday on 29 October 2007.

Annual Returns 
The following table shows the annual development of the WIG20 since 1991.

Composition

2020 

 Alior Bank
 Allegro
 Bank Pekao
 CCC
 CD Projekt
 Cyfrowy Polsat
 Dino Polska
 Grupa Lotos
 Jastrzębska Spółka Węglowa
 KGHM Polska Miedź
 LPP
 Orange Polska
 PGE Polska Grupa Energetyczna
 PGNiG
 PKN Orlen
 PKO BP
 PZU
 Mercator Medical
 Santander Bank Polska
 Tauron Polska

References

External links 
 Bloomberg page for WIG20:IND
 WIG20 on the Warsaw Stock Exchange

European stock market indices
Warsaw Stock Exchange